Pedro Nazar (born 23 October 1892, date of death unknown) was an Argentine fencer. He competed in the individual and team épée competitions at the 1924 Summer Olympics.

References

External links
 

1892 births
Year of death missing
Argentine male épée fencers
Olympic fencers of Argentina
Fencers at the 1924 Summer Olympics
20th-century Argentine people